Telugu Americans are citizens of the United States of America who are of Telugu linguistic origin from India, mostly from the Indian states of Andhra Pradesh and Telangana, but also from other neighboring states like Karnataka, Tamil Nadu, Odisha, Maharashtra, etc. They are a sub group of Indian Americans.

Immigration to United States 
In 2000, the Telugu population in the U.S. numbered around 87,543. By 2010, the number surged to 222,977 then 415,414 by 2017 and was 644,700 by 2020. The rise in Telugu population is attributed to the increasing representation of South Indian diaspora in technological field specially after Y2K. Brookings Institution Report revealed that Telugu states sent over 26,000 students between 2008 and 2012, most pursuing degrees in science, technology, engineering, or mathematics (STEM fields).

Demographics
Telugu people now constitute one of the largest groups of Indian Americans. The majority of Telugu Americans live in the San Francisco Bay Area, New York City, Northern Virginia, central New Jersey, Texas Triangle, Chicago, and Southern California, with smaller but significant populations throughout the country in major metropolitan and micropolitan areas of almost every state.

Religion 
The vast majority of Telugu Americans are Hindu, with some Muslim and Christian minorities.

Language

The Telugu community in the United States is largely bilingual. A recent study by the US-based Center for Immigration Studies has shown Telugu as the fastest growing language in United States which has grown by 86% in the last seven years. During the 2020 United States elections, the Telugu language was first listed on voter registration and ballot boxes in select locales.

The U.S. states with the largest percentage of Telugu speakers are:

 New Jersey (0.35%)
 Delaware (0.25%)
 Virginia (0.25%)
 Connecticut (0.18%)
 Illinois (0.17%)
 Texas (0.16%)
 California (0.15%)
 Maryland (0.15%)
 Georgia (0.14%)
 New Hampshire (0.13%)
 Washington (0.13%)
 Massachusetts (0.13%)
 Kansas (0.13%)
 Michigan (0.12%)
 Minnesota (0.11%)
 North Carolina (0.10%)
 Arizona (0.10%)
 Pennsylvania (0.09%)
 Ohio (0.07%)

Notable Telugu Americans

Government, politics, and philanthropy
Upendra J. Chivukula - Democratic politician who currently serves as a Commissioner on the New Jersey Board of Public Utilities after serving more than 12 years in the New Jersey General Assembly, where he had been the Deputy Speaker
Aruna Miller - Democratic Lieutenant Governor of Maryland, former member of the Maryland House of Delegates representing District 15 in Montgomery County, Maryland
Vinai Thummalapally - Executive Chairman of Red Fort Strategies,  U.S. ambassador to Belize (2009 - 2013)
Kris Kolluri - New Jersey Commissioner of Transportation
Narayana Kocherlakota - Economist, Former president of Federal Reserve Bank of Minneapolis
Sashi Reddy - Entrepreneur, venture capitalist and a philanthropist

Medicine, science, and technology
C. R. Rao (Calyampudi Radhakrishna Rao) - A living legend and doyen of statistics. One of the top statisticians the world has ever seen.
Satya Nadella - CEO of Microsoft
Shantanu Narayen - President and CEO of Adobe Systems
Raj Reddy - Computer scientist, founder of the Robotics Institute at Carnegie Mellon University, winner of Turing Award
Vijaya Gadde - Business executive and former global lead of legal, policy, and trust at Twitter
Padmasree Warrior - Former Chief Executive Officer of Nio Inc.
Arvind Krishna - Chairman and Chief executive officer (CEO) of IBM since 2021
Yellapragada Subbarao -  Indian biochemist who discovered the function of adenosine triphosphate as an energy source in the cell
Neeli Bendapudi - President of Penn State University, former President of University of Louisville
Ravi V. Bellamkonda - Vinik Dean of Engineering Duke University Edmund T. Pratt Jr. School of Engineering
Dabeeru C. Rao - Director of the Division of Biostatistics at Washington University School of Medicine
G. S. Maddala - Mathematician and economist best known for work in the field of Econometrics
J. N. Reddy - Professor and holder of the Oscar S. Wyatt Endowed Chair in Mechanical Engineering at Texas A&M University
Satya N. Atluri - Professor of mechanical & aerospace engineering at University of California, Irvine
Balamurali Ambati - American ophthalmologist, educator, and researcher. On May 19, 1995, he entered the Guinness Book of World Records as the world's youngest doctor.
Vamsi K. Mootha -  Physician-scientist and an Investigator of the Howard Hughes Medical Institute and a Professor of Systems Biology and of Medicine at Harvard Medical School
Rao Remala - First Indian employee at Microsoft
E. Premkumar Reddy - Molecular biologist/Molecular oncology. Director of Experimental Cancer Therapeutics program and Professor in the Departments of Oncological Sciences and Structural and Chemical Biology at the Mount Sinai School of Medicine.
V. Mohan Reddy - Pediatric cardiothoracic surgeon at Stanford University
Seshagiri Mallampati - Anesthesiologist who invented the Mallampati score for measuring the ease of endotracheal intubation
Mathukumalli Vidyasagar - Control theorist
Dattatreyudu Nori - Vice Chairman of the Radiation Oncologist Department at The New York-Presbyterian Hospital/Weill Cornell Medical College in New York City
Sirisha Bandla - Second India-born woman to go to space through Virgin Galactic Unity 22 mission
Ramani Durvasula - Clinical psychologist and professor of psychology at California State University, Los Angeles. Her practice and research deals with narcissism and its impact on relationships and society as a whole.

Activism, arts, literature, and media
Samina Ali, Author, feminist, activist
Vijaya Lakshmi Emani, Social activist, posthumously awarded Presidential Citizens Medal
Saagar Enjeti, Co-host of Breaking Points and The Hill
Uma Pemmaraju, Anchor and host on the Fox News Channel cable network
Aneesh Chaganty, Film director
Siddharth Katragadda, Screenwriter, film director, poet, writer, painter
Ashok Kondabolu, DJ, rapper, former member of hip-hop group Das Racist
Hari Kondabolu, Stand-up comedian
Aparna Nancherla, Comedian, actress, and voice actor of Hollyhock on Netflix show BoJack Horseman
Rushi Kota, Actor
Sarayu Rao, Actress
Ajay Naidu, Actor
Varun Sandesh, Actor
Adivi Sesh, Actor, director, writer
Akash Vukoti, TV personality
Raja Kumari, Singer
Vivek Maddala, Emmy-winning composer, recording artist and engineer
Nina Davuluri, Miss America 2014
Pratima Yarlagadda, Miss Indiana and finalist in Miss USA (1999)
Shobu Yarlagadda, Environmental engineer and film producer
Sreeleela, Actress
Harini Logan, TV Personality
Sravya Annappareddy, Social Service, Girl Scout

Sports
Laxmi Poruri, Tennis player

Social issues 
Telugu Americans have suffered from hate crimes in America. The most notable of these incidents was the 2017 Olathe, Kansas shooting, in which a white supremacist, Adam Purinton, harassed two Telugu immigrants, Srinivas Kuchibhotla and Alok Madasani, under the pretense that Kuchibhotla and Madasani were Iranians or illegal immigrants; later shooting them, killing Kuchibhotla and wounding Madasani as well as Ian Grillot, a white American who had come to the defense of Kuchibhotla and Madasani.

References

Further reading

 
 
 
Asian-American society
Telugu
South Asian American
America